Dhola is a census town and former petty Rajput princely state in Bhavnagar district, in the state of Gujarat, western India.

History 

Dhola was one of many non-salute states in Gohilwad prant on Saurashtra peninsula, comprising only the village. Under the British raj, the colonial Eastern Kathiawar Agency was in charge of it.

In 1901 it comprised only the village, with a population of 261, yielding 1,800 Rupees state revenue (1903-4, all from land), paying 384 Rupees tribute to the Gaikwar Baroda State and Junagadh State.

Geography 
It has an average elevation of 56 metres (183 feet).

Dhola is a Railway Junction in Bhavnagar State Railway.

Demographics 
 India census, Dhola had a population of 8049.
 Males constitute 52% of the population and females 48%.
 Dhola has an average literacy rate of 67%, higher than the national average of 59.5%: male literacy is 75% and, female literacy is 58%.
 In Dhola, 14% of the population is under 6 years of age.

References

External links and Sources 
 Imperial Gazetteer, on DSAL.UChicago.edu - Kathiawar

Cities and towns in Bhavnagar district